The Autonomous Left was a Chilean political movement which was a founding member of the Broad Front on 21 January 2017. One year later, the movement merged into the party Commons.

Notable members
 Gabriel Boric (until 2016)
 Jorge Sharp (until 2016)
 Francisco Figueroa

References

External links
 

Autonomism
Chilean political movements